KCRJ-LP (94.9 FM) was a radio station licensed to Monroe, Louisiana, United States. The station was owned by IBC Ministries.

The station's license was cancelled by the Federal Communications Commission on June 2, 2020, for failure to file a license renewal application.

References

External links
 

Radio stations in Louisiana
Mass media in Monroe, Louisiana
Low-power FM radio stations in Louisiana
Radio stations established in 2005
Radio stations disestablished in 2020
2005 establishments in Louisiana
2020 disestablishments in Louisiana
Defunct radio stations in the United States
Defunct mass media in Louisiana
Defunct religious radio stations in the United States